Im Sang-ho (born 30 September 1967) is a North Korean weightlifter. He competed in the men's lightweight event at the 1992 Summer Olympics.

References

1967 births
Living people
North Korean male weightlifters
Olympic weightlifters of North Korea
Weightlifters at the 1992 Summer Olympics
Place of birth missing (living people)